Cimexopsis is a genus of bed bugs in the family Cimicidae. There is one described species in Cimexopsis, C. nyctalis.

References

Further reading

 
 

Cimicidae
Articles created by Qbugbot